Vladimir Sergeyevich Vysotsky ,  Volodymyr Serhiyovych Vysotsky; (18 August 1954 – 5 February 2021) was a Russian admiral and Commander of the Russian Northern Fleet. On 12 September 2007, Vysotsky was appointed Commander-in-Chief of the Russian Navy, succeeding Vladimir Masorin who retired at age 60 the same day.

Career 
Vysotsky was born in Komarno, Lviv Oblast, Ukrainian SSR. He joined the Navy and graduated from the P.S. Nakhimov Black Sea Higher Naval School in Sevastopol in 1976. In 1982 Vysotsky completed the Advanced Officers Courses and was made Executive Officer of the aircraft carrier .

In 1990 Vysotsky was a Gold Medal graduate of the N. G. Kuznetsov Naval Academy and posted as commanding officer of the aircraft carrier Minsk. Subsequently, he commanded a squadron of Pacific Fleet missile ships. In 1999 he was a Gold Medal graduate of the General Staff Academy and appointed Chief of Staff and then Commander of the Russian Northern Fleet combined forces surface flotilla. In 2004 he was appointed Chief of Staff of the Baltic Fleet. In 2005 he was appointed Commander of the Northern Fleet and in 2007 Commander-in-Chief of the Russian Navy.  In May 2012 he was succeeded as Commander-in-Chief by Admiral Viktor Chirkov.

Vysotsky was married with two children.

Honours and awards 
 Order of Merit for the Fatherland, 4th class with Swords (1 October 2008)
 Order of Military Merit
 Order for Service to the Homeland in the Armed Forces of the USSR, 3rd class

Sources

External links 
Russian Navy Press release
Vladimir Vysotsky in English

Commanders-in-chief of the Russian Navy
1954 births
2021 deaths
Russian admirals
People from Komarno, Ukraine
Ukrainian emigrants to Russia
Recipients of the Order of Military Merit (Russia)
Recipients of the Order of Saint Righteous Grand Duke Dmitry Donskoy, 1st class
N. G. Kuznetsov Naval Academy alumni
Military Academy of the General Staff of the Armed Forces of Russia alumni